Goruni may refer to several villages in Romania:

 Goruni, a village in Lipnița Commune, Constanța County
 Goruni, a village in Tomești Commune, Iași County

See also 
 Gorun (disambiguation)
 Gorunești (disambiguation)